Coleophora canariipennella is a moth of the family Coleophoridae. It is found in Iraq.

References

canariipennella
Moths of Asia
Moths described in 1959